
The following is a list of Roman Catholic basilicas in Italy, listed by diocese and comune. The date of creation as a basilica is in parentheses.

Acerenza

Acerenza
Cathedral of Santa Maria Assunta (1956)

Acerra

Santa Maria a Vico
Santa Maria Assunta (1957)

Acireale

Acireale
Cathedral of Santa Maria Annunziata (1948)
Santi Pietro e Paolo (1933)
San Sebastiano (1990)

Castiglione di Sicilia
Maria Santissima della Catena (1985)

Randazzo
Santa Maria Assunta (1957)

Riposto
San Pietro (1967)

Acqui

Acqui
San Pietro (ancient)

Adria – Rovigo

Adria
Santa Maria della Tomba (ancient)

Lendinara
Santa Maria del Pilastrello (1911)

San Bellino
San Bellino (ancient)

Sant'Apollinare
Sant'Apollinare (ancient)

Agrigento

Agrigento
Cathedral of Santa Maria Assunta (1951)
Santi Maria Immaculata e Francesco d'Assisi (1940)

Sciacca
Santa Maria (1991)
San Calogero (1979)

Albano

Albano Laziale
Cathedral of Santi Giovanni Battista e Pancrazio (1865)

Anzio
Santa Teresa (1959)

Marino
San Barnaba Apostolo (1851)

Nettuno
Nostra Signora delle Grazie e Santa Maria Goretti (1970)

Albenga – Imperia

Imperia
San Maurizio (1947)

Pietra Ligure
San Nicolò di Bari (1992)

Alessandria

Quargnento
San Dalmatio (1992)

Alghero – Bosa

Cuglieri
Santa Maria della Neve (1919)

Alife – Caiazzo

Caiazzo
Concattedrale di Maria Santissima Assunta e Santo Stefano Vescovo (2013)

Piedimonte Matese
Santa Maria Maggiore (1945)

Altamura – Gravina – Acquaviva delle Fonti

Gravina in Puglia
Co-Cathedral of Maria Santissima Assunta (1993)

Amalfi – Cava de' Tirreni

Cava de' Tirreni
Santa Maria dell'Olmo (1931)

Minori
Santa Trofimena (1910)

Ravello
Santa Maria Assunta (1918)

Anagni – Alatri

Alatri
Co-Cathedral of San Paolo (1950)

Anagni
Cathedral of Maria Santissima Annunziata (ancient)

Ancona – Osimo

Ancona
Cathedral of San Ciriaco (1926)

Osimo
Co-Cathedral of Santa Tecla (1955)

Arezzo – Cortona – Sansepolcro

Arezzo
San Domenico (1960)
San Francesco d'Assisi (1955)

Bibbiena
Santa Maria del Sasso (1942)

Chiusi della Verna
Santa Maria Assunta (1921)

Cortona
Santa Margherita Penitente (1927)

Sansepolcro
Co-Cathedral of San Giovanni Evangelista (1962)

Ariano Irpino – Lacedonia

Ariano Irpino
Cathedral of Santa Maria Assunta (1984)

Ascoli Piceno

Ascoli Piceno
Cathedral of Madre di Dio e San Emidio (1857)

Assisi – Nocera Umbra – Gualdo Tadino

Assisi
Santa Chiara (1912)
Basilica of San Francesco d'Assisi (ancient)
Santa Maria degli Angeli (ancient)

Gualdo Tadino
San Benedetto (1980)

Aversa

Grumo Nevano

San Tammaro (1982)

Avezzano

Pescina
Basilica Concattedrale di S. Maria delle Grazie (2016)

Trasacco
San Cesidio e Rufino (ancient)

Bari – Bitonto

Bari
Cathedral of Santa Maria Assunta (1954)
San Nicola (ancient)
Santa Fara (2014)

Bitonto
Santi Medici Cosma e Damiano (1975)

Belluno – Feltre

Belluno
Cathedral of San Martino (1980)

Cortina d'Ampezzo
Santi Filippo e Giacomo (2011)

Feltre
Santi Vittore e Corona (2002)

Benevento

Benevento
Santa Maria delle Grazie (1957)

Vitulano
Santa Maria Annunziata (1991)

Bergamo

Alzano Lombardo
San Martino (1922)

Bergamo
Sant'Alessandro in Colonna (1998)

Clusone
Santi Maria Assunta e Giovanni Battista (1961)

Gandino
Santa Maria Assunta (1911)

Pontida
San Giacomo (1911)

Vercurago
Santi Bartolomeo e Girolamo Emiliani (1958)

Biella

Biella
Santa Maria di Oropa (1957)

Bologna

Bologna
Sant'Antonio da Padova (1939)
Santi Bartolomeo e Gaetano (1924)
San Domenico (1884)
San Francesco di Bologna (1935)
Basilica Beata Vergine di San Luca (1907)
Basilica Collegiata di Santa Maria Maggiore (ancient)
Santa Maria dei Servi (1954)
San Martino di Bologna (1941)
San Petronio Basilica (ancient)
San Paolo Maggiore (1961)
Santo Stefano (ancient)
San Giacomo Maggiore

Cento
San Blase (1980)

Bolzano – Brixen

Brixen
Cathedral of Santa Maria Assunta (1950)

Deutschnofen
Maria Weissenstein (1985)

Vahrn
Santa Maria Assunta (1956)

Brescia

Bagnolo Mella
Santa Maria della Visitazione (1999)

Brescia
Basilica di San Salvatore (ancient)
Santa Maria delle Grazie (1963)

Concesio
Basilica Sant’Antonino Martire (2016)

Montichiari
Santa Maria Assunta (1963)

Verolanuova
San Lorenzo Martire (1971)

Brindisi – Ostuni

Brindisi
Cathedral of San Giovanni Battista (1867)

Mesagne
Santa Maria (1999)

San Vito dei Normanni
Santa Maria della Vittoria (1998)

Cagliari

Cagliari
Basilica di Nostra Signora di Bonaria (1926)
Basilica di San Saturnino (1119)
Basilica di Santa Croce (1809)

Quartu Sant'Elena

Basilica di Sant'Elena Imperatrice (2007)

Caltagirone

Caltagirone
San Giacomo Apostolo (1816)
Cathedral of San Giuliano (1920)
Santa Maria della Modonna del Monte (1963)

Camerino – San Severino Marche

Camerino
Cathedral of Santissima Annunziata (1970)
San Venanzio (1950)

Campobasso - Bojano

Castelpetroso
Maria Santissima Addolorata (2013)

Capua

Capua
Sant'Angelo in Formis (ancient)
Cathedral of Santa Maria Assunta (1827)

Carpi

Carpi
Cathedral of Santa Maria Assunta (1979)

Casale Monferrato

Casale Monferrato
Sacro Cuore di Gesù (1969)

Serralunga di Crea
Sacro Monte di Crea (1951)

Caserta

Maddaloni
Corpus Domini (2003)

Cassano all'Ionio

Cassano all'Ionio
Basilica Cattedrale della Natività della Beata Vergine Maria del Lauro (2014)

Catania

Biancavilla
Santa Maria dell'Elemosina (1970)

Catania
Maria Santissima Annunziata al Carmine (1987)
Cathedral of Sant'Agata (1926)
Santa Maria dell'Elemosina (1946)

Pedara
Santa Caterina (1996)

Catanzaro – Squillace

Catanzaro
Maria Santissima Immacolata (1954)

Squillace
Co-Cathedral of Santa Maria Assunta (2014)

Cefalù

Cefalù
Cathedral of the Transfiguration (ancient)

Collesano
San Pietro (1983)

Montemaggiore Belsito
Sant'Agata (ancient)

Cerignola – Ascoli Satriano

Cerignola
Cathedral of San Pietro Apostolo (1999)

Cerreto Sannita – Telese – Sant'Agata de' Goti

Guardia Sanframondi
Santa Maria Assunta (1989)

Cesena – Sarsina

Cesena
Cathedral of San Giovanni Battista (1960)
Santa Maria del Monte (ancient)

Sarsina
Co-Cathedral of Santi Maria Annunziata e Vicinio (1961)

Chiavari

Chiavari
Cathedral of Nostra Signora dell'Orto e di Montallegro (1904)

Cogorno
San Salvatore (ancient)

Lavagna
Santo Stefano (1921)

Rapallo
Sanctuary of Monteallegro (1942)
Santi Gervasio e Protasio (1925)

Santa Margherita Ligure
Santa Margherita d'Antiochia (1951)

Sestri Levante
Santa Maria di Nazareth (1962)

Chieti — Vasto

Manoppello
Santuario del Volto Santo (2006)

Chioggia

Chioggia
Madonna della Navicella (1906)

Città di Castello

Città di Castello
Cathedral of San Florido (1888)

Civita Castellana

Castel Sant'Elia
Santa Maria ad Rupes (1912)
Sant'Elia

Città di Castello
Madonna del Transito (1998)

Civita Castellana
Cathedral of Santa Maria (ancient)

Como

Como
San Giorgio (1941)
Cathedral of Santa Maria Assunta (1951)

Tirano
Santa Maria dell'Apparizione (1927)

Conversano – Monopoli

Alberobello
Santi Cosma e Damiano (2000)

Conversano
Cathedral of Santa Maria Assunta (1997)

Monopoli
Co-Cathedral of Santa Maria della Mactia (1921)

Cosenza – Bisignano

Cosenza
Santuario del Beato Angelo (1980)

Dipignano
Madonna della Catena (1966)

Paola
San Francesco di Paola (1921)

Crema

Crema
Santa Maria della Croce, Crema (1958)

Cremona

Caravaggio
Nostra Signora di Caravaggio (1906)

Crotone – Santa Severina

Crotone
Cathedral of Santa Maria Assunta (1983)

Fabriano – Matelica

Fabriano
Cathedral of San Venanzio (1963)

Faenza – Modigliana

Faenza
Cathedral of San Pietro (1948)

Fano – Fossombrone – Cagli – Pergola

Cagli
Co-Cathedral of Santa Maria Assunta (1982)

Fano
Cathedral of Santa Maria Assunta (1953)
San Paterniano (ancient)

Pergola
San Lorenzo in Campo (1943)

Serra Sant'Abbondio
Santa Croce di Fonte Avellana (1982)

Fermo

Fermo
Cathedral of Santa Maria Assunta (1962)

Ferrara – Comacchio

Comacchio
Co-Cathedral of San Cassiano Martire (1961)

Ferrara
San Francesco d'Assisi (1956)
Cathedral of San Giorgio (1959)

Fidenza

Monticelli d'Ongina
San Lorenzo (1942)

Fiesole

Reggello
Santa Maria Assunta di Vallombrosa (1950)

San Giovanni Valdarno
Santa Maria delle Grazie (1929)

Florence

Florence
Baptistery of San Giovanni (ancient)
Santissima Annunziata (1806)
Santa Croce (1933)
San Lorenzo (ancient)
San Marco (1942)
Santa Maria del Carmine (1954)
Cathedral of Santa Maria del Fiore (ancient)
Santa Maria Novella (1919)
San Miniato al Monte (ancient)
Santo Spirito (ancient)
Santa Trinita (ancient)

Impruneta

Santa Maria all'Impruneta (1924)

Vaglia 
Santi Maria Addolorata e Filippo Benizi di Monte Senario (1917)

Foggia – Bovino

Bovino
Co-Cathedral of Santa Maria Assunta (1970)

Foggia
Cathedral of the Iconavetere (1806)
San Giovanni Battista (ancient)
Santa Maria (1978)

Forlì – Bertinoro

Forlì
Santa Maria (1977)
San Mercuriale (1959)

Forlimpopoli
San Rufillo (1999)

Fossano

Fossano
Cathedral of Santa Maria e San Giovenale (ancient)

Frascati

Frascati
Cathedral of San Pietro Apostolo (1975)

Frosinone – Veroli – Ferentino

Veroli
Santi Giovanni e Paolo di Casamari (1957)

Gaeta

Gaeta
Cathedral of Santa Maria Assunta (1848)

Lenola
Basilica Santuario della Madonna del Colle (2015)

Genoa

Arenzano
Bambino Gesù di Praga (1928)

Camogli
Santa Maria Assunta (1988)

Ceranesi
Nostra Signora della Guardia sul Monte Figogna (1915)

Genoa
San Francesco di Paola (1930)
Santa Maria Assunta di Carignano (1951)
Santa Maria Immacolata (1905)
Santa Maria del Monte (1946)
Santa Maria delle Vigne (1983)
Nostra Signora Assunta (1951)

Gorizia

Aquileia
Santa Maria Assunta in Cielo (ancient)

Grado
Santi Ermagora e Fortunato (ancient)
Sant'Eufemia

Monfalcone
Sant'Ambrogio (1940)

Grosseto

Grosseto
Sacro Cuore di Gesù (1958)

Gubbio

Gubbio
Sant'Ubaldo (1919)

Iglesias

Sant'Antioco
Sant'Antioco Martire (1991)

Imola

Imola

Cathedral of San Cassiano Martire (1981)
Santa Maria del Piratello (1954)

Lugo
Madonna del Molino (1951)

Ischia

Casamicciola Terme
Sacro Cuore e Santa Maria Maddalena (1965)

Forio
Beata Vergine Maria Incoronata (1989)
San Vito (1988)

Lacco Ameno
Santa Restituta (2001)

Jesi

Jesi
Cathedral of San Settimio (1969)

Lamezia - Terme

Conflenti
Basilica Santuario Maria Santissima della Quercia di Visora (2018)

Lanciano – Ortona

Lanciano
Cathedral of Madonna del Ponte (1909)

Ortona
Co-Cathedral of San Tommaso Apostolo (1859)

L'Aquila

L'Aquila
San Bernardino (1946)

La Spezia – Sarzana – Brugnato

Sarzana
Co-Cathedral of Santa Maria Assunta (1947)

Lecce

Lecce
Santa Croce (1905)
San Domenico Savio (1984)
San Giovanni Battista al Rosario (1948)

Livorno

Livorno
Madonna delle Grazie di Montenero (1818)

Locrice - Gerace

Gerace
Basilica Concattedrale di S. Maria Assunta (2018)

Lodi

Lodi
Cathedral of San Bassiano (1970)

Sant'Angelo Lodigiano
Santa Francesca Saverio Cabrini (1950)

Loreto

Loreto
Basilica della Santa Casa (ancient)

Lucca

Lucca
San Frediano (1957)
Santi Paolino e Donato (ancient)

Lucera – Troia

Lucera
Cathedral of Maria Santissima Assunta in Cielo (1834)

Troia
Co-Cathedral of Santa Maria Assunta (1958)

Viareggio
Sant'Andrea (1963)
San Paolino (1958)

Macerata – Tolentino – Recanati – Cingoli – Treia

Macerata
Madonna della Misericordia (1921)

Recanati
Co-Cathedral of San Flaviano (1804)

Tolentino
Co-Cathedral of San Catervo (1961)
Pro-Cathedral of San Nicola di Tolentino (1783)

Manfredonia – Vieste – San Giovanni Rotondo

Manfredonia
Santa Maria Maggiore di Siponto (1977)

Monte Sant'Angelo
San Michele Arcangelo (ancient)

Vieste
Co-Cathedral of Maria Santissima Assunta in cielo (1981)

Mantua

Castiglione delle Stiviere

San Luigi Gonzaga (1964)

Curtatone
Santa Maria delle Grazie (ancient)

Goito
Madonna della Salute (1946)

Mantua
Santa Barbara (ancient)
Co-Cathedral of Sant'Andrea (ancient)

San Benedetto Po
San Benedetto in Polirone (ancient)

Massa Carrara – Pontremoli

Massa
Cathedral of Santi Pietro Apostolo e Francesco d'Assisi (1964)

Massa Marittima – Piombino

Massa Marittima
Cathedral of Cerbone Vescovo (1975)

Matera – Irsina

Matera
Cathedral of San Eustachio (1962)

Mazara del Vallo

Mazara del Vallo
Cathedral of Santissima Salvatore (1980)

Melfi – Rapolla – Venosa

Melfi
Cathedral of Santa Maria Assunta (1958)

Messina – Lipari – Santa Lucia del Mela

Barcellona Pozzo di Gotto
San Sebastiano (1936)

Lipari
San Cristoforo di Canneto di Lipari (2004)

Messina
Cathedral of Santa Maria Assunta (1947)

Montalbano Elicona
Santa Maria Assunta (1997)

Taormina
San Nicolò di Bari (1980)

Milan

Abbiategrasso
Santa Maria Nuova (1962)

Besana in Brianza
Santi Pietro, Marcellino ed Erasmo (1998)

Busto Arsizio
San Giovanni Battista (1948)

Cantù
San Paolo (1950)

Desio
Santi Siro e Materno (1936)

Gallarate
Santa Maria Assunta (1946)

Imbersago
Madonna del Bosco (1958)

Lecco
San Nicolo di Bari (1943)

Legnano
San Magno (1950)

Magenta
San Martino (1948)

Melegnano
Nativita di San Giovanni Battista (1992)

Milan
Corpus Domini (1950)
Sant'Ambrogio (1874)
Sant'Antonio di Padova (1937)
San Carlo Borromeo al Corso (1938)
San Celso (1929)
Santa Maria di Caravaggio (1979)
Santa Maria delle Grazie (1993)
Santa Maria di Lourdes (1957)
Santi Nereo e Achilleo (1990)

Missaglia
San Vittore (1946)

Monza
Cathedral of San Giovanni Battista (ancient)

Rho
Santa Maria Addolorata (1923)

Saronno
Santa Maria dei Miracoli (1923)

Seregno
San Giuseppe (1981)

Sesto San Giovanni
Santo Stefano (1991)

Somma Lombardo
Sant'Agnese (2004)

Treviglio
Santi Martino e Maria Assunta (1951)

Varese
San Vittore Martire Varese (1925)

Mileto – Nicotera – Tropea

Mileto
Basilica Cattedrale di Maria SS. Assunta in Cielo (2016)

Seminara
Madonna dei Poveri (1955)

Vallelonga
Madonna di Monserrato (1971)

Modena – Nonantola

Fiorano Modenese
Beata Vergine del Castello (1989)

Modena
Cathedral of Santa Maria Assunta e San Geminiano (1934)
San Pietro (1956)

Molfetta – Ruvo – Giovinazzo – Terlizzi

Molfetta
Madonna dei martiri (1987)

Mondovì

Vicoforte
Sanctuary of Madonna Santissima del Mondovì a Vico (1735)

Monreale

Monreale
Cathedral of Santa Maria (1926)

Monte Cassino

Cassino
Cathedral of Maria Santissima Assunta e San Benedetto Abate (ancient)

Pescocostanzo
Santa Maria del Colle (1976)

Napoli (Naples)

Afragola
Sant'Antonio di Padova

Casoria
San Maurino (1999)

Ercolano
Basilica of Santa Maria a Pugliano (1574)

Naples
Basilica Santuario del Gesù Vecchio (1958)
San Domenico Maggiore (1921)
San Francesco di Paola (1836)
San Gennaro ad Antignano (1905)
San Giacomo Maggiore degli Spagnoli (1911)
San Paolo Maggiore (1951)
Santa Chiara
Santa Maria della Neve (Ponticelli, near Napoli) (1988)
Basilica del Carmine Maggiore (1917)
Basilica di Santa Maria della Sanità
Basilica di Santa Restituta
Basilica di San Pietro ad Aram
Basilica dell'Incoronata Madre del Buon Consiglio (1980)
San Lorenzo Maggiore
Basilica di San Giovanni Maggiore
San Gennaro fuori le mura

Torre del Greco
Santa Croce (1957)

Nardò – Gallipoli

Gallipoli
Cathedral of Sant'Agata (1946)

Nardò
Cathedral of Santa Maria Assunta (1980)

Parabita
Santa Maria della Coltura (1999)

Nicosia

Assoro
San Leone (ancient)

Nicosia
Santa Maria Maggiore (1819)
San Nicolò (1967)

Nocera Inferiore – Sarno

Nocera Inferiore
Cathedral of San Prisco (ancient)
Sant'Anna (ancient)
Sant'Antonio (ancient)

Nocera Superiore
Santa Maria Santissima di Materdomini (1923)

Pagani
Sant'Alfonso Maria de' Liguori (1908)

Nola

Nola
Cathedral of Santa Maria Assunta (1954)

Torre Annunziata
Santa Maria della Neve (1979)

Visciano
Madonna Consolatrice del Carpinello (1986)

Noto

Modica
Basilica Santuario Madonna delle Grazie (2015)

Novara

Gozzano
San Giuliano diacono (ancient)

Novara
San Gaudenzio (ancient)

Orta San Giulio
Basilica di San Giulio (ancient)

Re
Santuario della Madonna del Sangue (1958)

Varallo Sesia
Santa Maria delle Grazie (1931)

Verbania
San Vittore (1947)

Oria

Oria
Cathedral of Santa Maria Assunta in Cielo (1991)

Oristano

Oristano
Santa Maria del Rimedio (1957)

Orvieto – Todi

Bolsena
Santa Cristina (1976)

Orvieto
Cathedral of Santa Maria Assunta (1889)

Todi
Amore Misericordioso (1982)
Co-Cathedral of Santa Maria Annunziata (1958)

Otranto

Galatina
Santa Caterina d'Alessandria (1992)

Otranto
Cathedral of Santa Maria Annunziata (1945)

Padua

Este
Santa Maria della Grazie (1923)

Padua
Sant'Antonio (ancient)
Santa Giustina (1909)
Cathedral of Santa Maria Assunta (ancient)
Santa Maria del Monte Carmelo (1960)

Teolo
Santa Maria Assunta (1954)

Palermo

Monreale
San Martino delle Scale (1966)

Palermo
San Francesco d'Assisi (1924)
Santa Trinita (ancient)

Santa Flavia
Basilica Soluntina di Sant'Anna (1764)

Palestrina

Genazzano
Santa Maria del Buon Consiglio (1903)

Palestrina
Cathedral of Sant'Agapito (ancient)

Parma

Fontanellato
Santuario della Beata Vergine del Santo Rosario (1903)

Parma
Cathedral of Santa Maria Assunta (1834)
Santa Maria della Steccata (2008)

Patti

Patti
Basilica Santuario Maria Santissima di Tindari (2018)

Pavia

Pavia
Santa Maria (1995)
San Pietro in Ciel d'Oro (?)

Perugia – Città della Pieve

Perugia
San Domenico (1961)
San Constanzo (2008)

Pesaro

Pesaro
Cathedral of Santa Maria Assunta (ancient)
Santi Decenzio e Germano (ancient)

Pescara – Penne

Pescara
Santa Maria dei Sette Dolori (1959)

Pescia

Montecatini Terme
Santa Maria Assunta (1988)

Monsummano Terme 
Maria Santissima della Fontenuova (1974)

Piacenza – Bobbio

Bedonia
Beata Vergine della Consolazione (1978)

Bobbio
Santa Maria dell'Aiuto (1970)

Piacenza
San Antonino (ancient)
Cathedral of Santi Giustina e Maria Assunta (ancient)
Santa Maria di Campagna (1954)
San Savino (ancient)
Santo Sepolcro (ancient)

Piazza Armerina

Piazza Armerina
Cathedral of Santa Maria Santissima Delle Vittorie (1962)

Pinerolo

Pinerolo
San Maurizio (2002)

Pisa

Pisa
San Pietro Apostolo (ancient)

Pistoia

Pistoia
Santa Maria dell'Umiltà (1931)
Cathedral of San Zeno (1965)

Pompei

Pompei
Shrine of the Virgin of the Rosary of Pompei (ancient)

Potenza – Muro Lucano – Marsico Nuovo

Avigliano
Santa Maria del Carmine (1999)

Potenza
Cathedral of Santa Maria Assunta e San Gerardo Vescovo (1980)

Viggiano
Madonna Nera del Sacro Monte (1965)

Pozzuoli

Pozzuoli
Cathedral of Santa Maria Assunta (1949)

Prato

Prato
Santa Maria delle Carceri (1939)
Cathedral of Santo Stefano (1996)
Santi Vincenzo Ferreri e Caterina de' Ricci (1947)

Ragusa

Comiso
Santissima Annunziata (ancient)
Santa Maria delle Stelle (ancient)

Monterosso Almo
Santa Maria Assunta (ancient)

Vittoria
San Giovanni Battista (ancient)

Ravenna – Cervia

Ravenna
Sant'Apollinare in Classe (1960)
Santa Maria in Porto (1960)
Cathedral of the Resurrection (1960)
San Vitale (1960)
Sant'Apollinare Nuovo
San Francesco

Reggio Calabria – Bova

Reggio Calabria
Cathedral of Maria Santissima Assunta in Cielo (1978)

Reggio Emilia – Guastalla

Boretto
San Marco (1956)

Reggio Emilia
Madre della Consolazione (1971)
Santa Maria della Ghiara (1954)
San Prospero

Rieti

Rieti
Cattedrale di Santa Maria Assunta (1841)

Rome
There are 4 major basilicas of the Catholic Church in the Italian peninsula; 3 in the city of Rome proper and 1 in Vatican City. The latter is completely surrounded by the city of Rome and is part of the Diocese of Rome.
San Pietro in Vaticano (ancient)
San Giovanni in Laterano (ancient)
San Paolo fuori le Mura (ancient)
Santa Maria Maggiore (ancient)

There are 62 minor basilicas of the Catholic Church in Rome, excluding the above major basilicas.

Rome

Nostra Signora di Guadalupe e San Filippo in Via Aurelia (1991)
Sacro Cuore di Cristo Re (1965)
Sacro Cuore di Gesù a Castro Pretorio (1921) 
 Cuore Immacolato di Maria (1959)
Sant'Agnese fuori le Mura (ancient)
Basilica of Sant'Agostino (1999)
Santi Ambrogio e Carlo (1929) 
Basilica di Sant'Anastasia al Palatino (ancient)
Sant'Andrea delle Fratte (1942)
Sant'Andrea della Valle (1965)
Sant'Antonio da Padova in Via Merulana (1931)
Sant'Apollinare alle Terme Neroniane-Alessandrine (1984)
Santa Balbina (ancient)
San Bartolomeo all'Isola (ancient)
Santi Bonifacio e Alessio (ancient)
San Camillo de Lellis (1965)
Santa Cecilia in Trastevere (ancient)
Santi Celso e Giuliano (ancient)
San Clemente al Laterano (ancient)
Santi Cosma e Damiano (ancient)
San Crisogono in Trastevere (ancient)
Santa Croce in Gerusalemme (ancient)
Santa Croce in Via Flaminia (1964)
Santi Dodici Apostoli (ancient)
San Eugenio (1951)
San Eustachio (ancient)
San Giovanni Battista dei Fiorentini (1918)
San Giovanni Bosco (1965)
Santi Giovanni e Paolo al Celio (ancient)
San Giuseppe al Trionfale (1970)
San Lorenzo in Damaso (ancient)
San Lorenzo in Lucina (1908)
San Lorenzo fuori le Mura (ancient)
San Marco Evangelista al Campidoglio (ancient)
Santa Maria degli Angeli e dei Martiri (1920)
Santa Maria in Aracoeli (ancient)
Santa Maria Ausiliatrice (1969)
Santa Maria in Cosmedin (ancient)
Santa Maria ad Martyres in Campo (Pantheon) (ancient)
Santa Maria sopra Minerva (ancient)
Santa Maria in Montesanto (1825)
Santa Maria Nova (Santa Francesca Romana) (ancient)
Santa Maria del Popolo (ancient)
Santa Maria Regina degli Apostoli alla Montagnola (1984)
Santa Maria in Trastevere (ancient)
Santa Maria in Via Lata (ancient)
San Martino ai Monti (ancient)
San Nicola in Carcere (ancient)
San Pancrazio (ancient)
San Pietro in Vincoli (ancient)
Ss. Pietro e Paolo a Via Ostiense (1967)
Santa Prassede all'Esquilino (ancient)
Santa Pudenziana al Viminale (ancient)
Santi Quattro Coronati al Laterano (ancient)
San Saba (ancient)
Santa Sabina all'Aventino (ancient)
San Sebastiano fuori le mura (ancient)
San Sisto Vecchio in Via Appia (ancient)
Santa Sofia (1998)
Santo Stefano Rotondo (ancient)
Santa Teresa d'Avila (1951)
Santi Vitale e Compagni Martiri in Fovea (ancient)

Salerno – Campagna – Acerno

Campagna
Co-Cathedral of Santa Maria della Pace (1925)

Salerno
Cathedral of San Matteo (ancient)

San Benedetto del Tronto – Ripatransone – Montalto

Montalto delle Marche
Co-Cathedral of Santa Maria Assunta (1965)

Ripatransone
Co-Cathedral of San Gregorio Magno (1965)

San Benedetto del Tronto
Cathedral of Santa Maria della Marina (2001)

San Marco Argentano – Scalea

San Sosti
Maria Santissima del Pettoruto (1979)

Sant'Angelo dei Lombardi – Conza – Nusco – Bisaccia

Caposele
Sanctuary of San Gerardo Maiella (1929)
Santa Maria Assunta (1930)

Sassari

Sassari
Sacro Cuore (1980)

Savona – Noli

Finale Ligure
San Biagio (1949)
San Giovanni Battista (1930)

Savona
Nostra Signora di Misericordia (1904)
Cathedral of Santa Maria Assunta (1816)

Senigallia

Senigallia
Cathedral of San Pietro (1932)

Sessa Aurunca

Sessa Aurunca
Santi Pietro e Paolo (1929)

Siena – Colle di Val d'Elsa – Montalcino

Asciano
Sant'Agata (1991)

Poggibonsi
San Lucchese (1938)

San Gimignano
Santa Maria Assunta (1932)

Siena

Basilica Cateriniana di San Domenico (1925)
Basilica di San Bernardino da Siena (1924)
Santa Maria dei Servi (1908)

Siracusa

Siracusa
Basilica Santuario Madonna delle Lacrime (2002)

Sora – Aquino – Pontecorvo

Aquino
Co-Cathedral of Santi Costanzo e Tommaso d'Aquino (1974)

Pontecorvo
Co-Cathedral of San Bartolomeo (1958)

Settefrati
Basilica Santuario Maria Santissima di Canneto (2015)

Sorrento – Castellammare di Stabia

Castellammare di Stabia
Santa Maria di Pozzano (1916)

Meta
Santa Maria del Lauro (1914)

Piano di Sorrento
San Michele (1914)

Sorrento
Sant'Antonino Abate (1924)

Spoleto – Norcia

Cascia
Santa Rita da Cascia (1955)

Norcia
San Benedetto (1966; destroyed 2016)

Subiaco

Subiaco
Co-Cathedral of Sant'Andrea (1952)
Cathedral of Santa Scolastica (ancient)

Sulmona – Valva

Sulmona
Cathedral of San Panfilo (1818)

Taranto

Martina Franca
San Martino (1998)

Taranto
Cathedral of San Cataldo (1964)

Teano – Calvi

Roccamonfina
Santuario Maria Santi dei Lattani (1970)

Teggiano – Policastro

Latronico
San Egidio (1971)

Maratea
San Biagio (1940)

Tempio – Ampurias

Olbia
San Simplicio (1993)

Teramo – Atri

Atri
Co-Cathedral of Santa Maria Assunta (1964)

Isola del Gran Sasso
Santuario di San Gabriele dell'Addolorata (1929)

Teramo
Cathedral of Santa Maria Assunta (1955)

Termoli – Larino

Larino
Co-Cathedral of Santa Maria Assunta (1928)

Termoli
Cathedral of Santi Basso e Timoteo (1947)

Tortona

Broni
San Pietro (1953)

Tortona
Madonna della Guardia (1991)

Trani – Barletta – Bisceglie

Barletta
Co-Cathedral of Santa Maria Assunta (1961)
San Sepolcro (1951)

Bisceglie
Co-Cathedral of San Pietro Apostolo (1980)

Trani
Cathedral of Santa Maria Assunta (1960)

Trapani

Alcamo
Santa Maria Assunta (1969)

Trapani
Cathedral of San Lorenzo (ancient)
Santa Maria Annunziata (1950)
San Nicola (ancient)
San Pietro (ancient)

Trento

Sanzeno
Santi Sisinio, Martirio e Alessandro (1973)

Trento
Santa Maria Maggiore (1973)
Cathedral of San Vigilio (1913)

Treviso

Treviso
La Madonna Grande (1917)

Trieste

Trieste
Cathedral of San Giusto (1899)

Turin

Castelnuovo Don Bosco
Basilica di Don Bosco (2010)

Turin
Basilica of Corpus Domini (1928)
Santuario della Consolata (1906)
Basilica di Santa Maria Ausiliatrice (1911)

Tursi – Lagonegro

Tursi
Basilica Santuario Santa Maria d'Anglona Della Natività di Maria (1999)

Udine

Cividale del Friuli
Santa Maria Assunta di Cividale del Friuli (1909)

Udine
Santa Maria della Grazie (1921)

Ugento – Santa Maria di Leuca

Castrignano del Capo
Santa Maria di Santa Maria di Leuca (1990)

Urbino – Urbania – Sant'Angelo in Vado

Sant'Angelo in Vado
Co-Cathedral of San Michele Arcangelo (1947)

Urbino
Cathedral of Santa Maria Assunta (1950)

Vallo della Lucania

Castellabate
Santa Maria de Gulia (1988)

Velletri – Segni

Velletri
Cathedral of San Clemente I (1784)

Venice

Venice
San Giorgio Maggiore (1900)
Cathedral of San Marco (ancient)
Santa Maria Assunta di Torcello (ancient)
Santa Maria Gloriosa dei Frari (1926)
Santa Maria della Salute (1921)
Santi Maria e San Donato di Murano (ancient)
San Pietro di Castello (ancient)
San Zanipolo (SS. Giovanni e Paolo) (1922)

Ventimiglia – San Remo

Sanremo
Sacro Cuore di Gesù di Bussana Nuova (1939)
San Siro (1947)

Taggia
Santi Giacomo e Filippo e Cuore Immacolato di Maria (1942)

Vercelli

Vercelli
Sant'Andrea (ancient)
Cathedral of San Eusebio (1834)
Santi Trinità e Maria Maggiore (ancient)

Verona

Caprino Veronese
Madonna della Corona (1982)

Lonato del Garda
San Giovanni Battista (1980)

Verona
Madonna di Campagna (1986)
Santa Teresa di Gesù Bambino in Tombetta (1938)
San Zeno (1973)

Vicenza

Vicenza
Monte Berico (1904)

Vigevano

Mortara
San Lorenzo (1939)

Viterbo

Acquapendente
Co-Cathedral of San Sepolcro (ancient)

Grotte di Castro
Santa Maria del Suffragio (1967)

Montefiascone
San Flaviano (ancient)
Pro-Cathedral of Santa Margherita d'Antiochia (1943)

Orte
Santa Maria Assunta (ancient)

Viterbo
San Francesco d'Assisi (1949)
Cathedral of San Lorenzo (1940)
Santa Maria della Quercia (1867)

Vittorio Veneto

Follina
Santa Maria Annunciata (1921)

Motta di Livenza
Madonna dei Miracoli (1875)

Volterra

Volterra
Cathedral of Santa Maria Assunta (1957)

See also
List of basilicas
List of cathedrals
Roman Catholic Church

External links
List of Italian basilicas from GCatholic.org

 
Basilicas in Italy
Italy